William Ray may refer to:

 Will Ray (born 1950), American guitarist
 William Ray (medicine) (1884–1953), academic in Adelaide, South Australia
 William Ray (Oregon politician), member of the Oregon Territorial Legislature, 1856
 William H. Ray (1812–1881), United States Representative from Illinois
 William Hallett Ray (1825–1909), Canadian politician, farmer, and merchant
 William M. Ray II (born 1963), American judge
 Sir William Ray (British politician), Leader of London County Council, 1925–1934, MP for Richmond, 1932–1937
 William Francis Ray, politician from Franklin, Massachusetts. 
 Bill Ray (bishop), 10th Anglican Bishop of North Queensland, Australia
 Billy Ray (screenwriter), screenwriter, director, and producer

See also
William Rae (disambiguation)
William Wray (disambiguation)
Bill Ray (disambiguation)
Billy Ray (disambiguation)